Rheintal is the Rhine Valley in Europe.

Rheintal may also refer to:

 Alpine Rhine Valley (German: Alpenrheintal), a glacial alpine valley in Europe
 Rheintal (Wahlkreis), a constituency of the canton of St. Gallen, Switzerland
 Vogtei Rheintal, a condominium of the Old Swiss Confederacy from the 15th century until 1798

See also

 Rhine, a European river